The Netherlands Antilles competed at every edition of the Pan American Games from the second edition of the multi-sport event in 1955 until the 2011 games. Netherlands Antilles did not compete at the only Winter Pan American Games. 2011 marked the last appearance for the country, albeit under the Pan American Sports Organization flag. Since 2015, Curaçaoan and St. Maartener athletes have been eligible to represent Aruba.

Medal count 

To sort the tables by host city, total medal count, or any other column, click on the  icon next to the column title.

Summer

Winter

References